Evermore: The Art of Duality is the second studio album by American hip hop duo The Underachievers. It was released on September 25, 2015 by RPM MSC Distribution. The album peaked at No. 9 for a week on Billboard. The album cover artwork was created by Pencil Fingerz.

Description 
The album has two half-an-hour segments; acoustic and electronic. The starting track of the album is Rain Dance (Phase 1 Intro).

Track listing

Credits 
Artwork – Davis 'Pencilfingerz' Graham

Executive-Producer – AK The Savior*, Issa Gold, Nick León, Rene Mclean (2)

Mastered By – Daddy Kev

Mixed By – Daddy Kev (tracks: A1 to A6, B1, B6)

Producers – Ashton Benz (tracks: A6, B5), Evan Imwalle (tracks: A5), IGNORVNCE (tracks: B2), Lucas Savo (tracks: A6), Mrbist0l* (tracks: B3), Nick León (tracks: A1 to A5, B4, B6), POSHstronaut (tracks: B4), Phil Jackson (6) (tracks: B1)

References

2015 albums
The Underachievers albums